Idaho Legislative District 30 is one of 35 districts of the Idaho Legislature. It is currently represented by Dean Mortimer, Republican of Idaho Falls, Jeff Thompson, Republican of Idaho Falls, and Wendy Horman, Republican of Idaho Falls.

District profile (1992–2002) 
From 1992 to 2002, District 30 consisted of a portion of Bonneville County.

District profile (2002–2012) 
From 2002 to 2012, District 30 consisted of a portion of Bannock County.

District profile (2012–present) 
District 30 currently consists of a portion of Bonneville County.

See also

 List of Idaho Senators
 List of Idaho State Representatives

References

External links
Idaho Legislative District Map (with members)
Idaho Legislature (official site)

30
Bonneville County, Idaho